Epania cingalensis is a species of Longhorn beetle endemic to Sri Lanka.

References 

Cerambycinae
Insects of Sri Lanka
Insects described in 1936